Daniel Ploug Jorgensen (born April 4, 1968) is an American former competition swimmer who represented the United States at two consecutive Olympic Games.

Career 
At the 1988 Summer Olympics in Seoul, South Korea, he earned a gold medal by swimming for the winning U.S. team in the men's 4×200-meter freestyle relay.  Individually, he also competed in the B Final of the men's 400-meter freestyle and finished fourteenth overall (3:55.34).

Four years later at the 1992 Summer Olympics in Barcelona, Spain, Jorgensen again swam in the preliminary heats of the men's 4×200-meter freestyle relay, and received a bronze medal when the U.S. team placed third in the event final.  He also swam in the preliminary heats of the men's 400-meter freestyle, but did not advance.

His brother Lars also competed at the 1988 Olympics for the United States.

See also
 List of Olympic medalists in swimming (men)
 List of University of Southern California people
 List of World Aquatics Championships medalists in swimming (men)

References

External links
 

1968 births
Living people
American male freestyle swimmers
Olympic bronze medalists for the United States in swimming
Olympic gold medalists for the United States in swimming
Sportspeople from New London, Connecticut
Swimmers at the 1988 Summer Olympics
Swimmers at the 1992 Summer Olympics
USC Trojans men's swimmers
World Aquatics Championships medalists in swimming
Medalists at the 1992 Summer Olympics
Medalists at the 1988 Summer Olympics
20th-century American people
21st-century American people